Salil Gewali (born 21 January 1971) is an Indian researcher, writer and journalist. He is a writer of 18 books, including school textbooks. He is best known for the publication of the book Great Minds on India. The outcome of an extensive research spanning over two decades, the title by Gewali has been translated into thirteen languages.

Early life and education
Gewali was born in Shillong, Meghalaya in 1971. He completed his post-graduation in English Literature. His father, (Late) Krishna Prasad Gewali was a scholar of ancient scriptures and a writer. He passed his School Leaving Certificate examination from Mawprem Modern High School in 1986 and joined  St. Anthony's College, Shillong, Meghalaya for further studies.

Literary career
Gewali started his career as a freelance writer in late 1980s. Gewali is credited with several articles on social menaces, such as drug abuse, alcoholism and social media addiction among youths discussing how they have adversely affected society at large. He has prolifically written to raise awareness about the environmental fallout due to excessive exploitation of the earth's crust and greenhouse gas emissions. His articles and letters appear in several local, national and international newspapers and magazines.

From an early age, Gewali was inspired to study various ancient texts, and the philosophy of Vedanta and the Bhagavad Gita fascinated him the most. Gewali was convinced from early age that world-renowned Quantum physicists including Erwin Schrödinger, Niels Bohr, Julius Oppenheimer, Werner Heisenberg, and Brian David Josephson; and also front-ranking philosophers of the modern times including Voltaire, Johann Goethe, Hegel, Ralph Waldo Emerson and Henry Thoreau had obtained ideas for their researches and writings from the ancient Indian literature. Gewali had undertaken his research from this belief and it also greatly influenced writing of his book Great Minds on India.

Gewali is also an India correspondent for AltNewsMedia of London, UK. He is appointed as a volunteer of International Human Rights Commission, Zürich, Switzerland in 2022.

Great Minds on India 

Gewali published his book entitled Great Minds on India from Penguin Books in 2013. The first edition of the book was published in Xerox format in 1998 and the regular print was published in 2009 which was formally launched by the Governor of Meghalaya – Ranjit Shekhar Mooshahary. Later, the book was translated in thirteen languages including Telugu, Malayalam, Marathi, Hindi, Gujarati, Tamil and Nepali. It is a collection of the thoughts and quotes of world-renowned personalities on India's cultural heritage and ancient wisdom. It is edited by a former NASA scientist – Prof A.V. Murali of Houston, USA and prefaced by a NASA Chief scientist – Dr. Kamlesh Lulla of Texas, USA. The book was launched by the respective Government of Gujarat, Maharashtra, Chhattisgarh and Meghalaya. The Bengali version of the book was released on  July 5, 2019 by the Governor of West Bengal Keshari Nath Tripathi at Raj Bhavan in Kolkata. The book has been translated by Dr RN Das and edited by Prof. Nirmal Maity of Kolkata.
The German edition of Great Minds on India  has been translated by Caroline Hagen of Cologne, Germany.
 In 2022 the German edition of Great Minds on India was released by the Chief Minister of Meghalaya, Conrad Sangma. The Urdu edition has been translated by Dr. Syed Hussain, edited by Abdul Khalique and published by a Muslim organisation, Dr. APJ Abdul Kalam Foundation of Howrah, West Bengal. On December 9, 2022, the Chief Minister of Manipur, N. Biren Singh and the Chief Minister of Sikkim, Prem Singh Tamang, jointly released the Manipuri edition of Gewali's book in Manipur.  Governments of Punjab, Karnataka and Assam have also consented to translate Great Minds on India into their respective states’ official languages such as -- Punjabi, Kannada and Assamese.

Know Your India 

Know Your India is Gewali's other title published in 2022 which was released by the Chief Minister of Sikkim, Prem Singh Tamang in Gangtok. The forewords to the book were written by an eminent Lahore-born scholar from London – Khalid Umar and another scholar Linda Epton from Perth, Australia. Know Your India is a collection of articles that are essentially about the significance of the literary wisdom of ancient India and its relevance in modern times.

In June 2018, a short documentary on Great Minds on India was released by a Mumbai-based media house - Manthanhub.

Gewali has written a series of school textbooks that are prescribed by the Meghalaya Board of School Education (MBOSE) of the Government of Meghalaya. Some of the titles have also been approved as reference books for the Meghalaya Teacher Eligibility Test (MTET).

References

External links
 Book release by the West Bengal Governor; Millennium Post
 Altnewsmedia, article
 German translation

Living people
People from Shillong
English-language writers from India
1971 births